James O'Hehir (13 May 1887 - 17 April 1957) was an Irish civil servant and hurling and Gaelic football trainer.

Biography

Born in Ballynacally, County Clare, O'Hehir joined the civil service in London in 1907. The following year he was transferred to Dublin where he worked in the Department of Local Government until his retirement. A keen sportsman, he trained the Clare senior hurling team which, in 1914, won their first ever All-Ireland Championship. In the 1927 season he acceded to a request to become trainer of the Leitrim senior football team and guided them to their inaugural Connacht Senior Football Championship win.

O'Hehir died from prostate cancer on 17 April 1957. He was survived by his wife and son, Michael O'Hehir.

Honours

Clare
All-Ireland Senior Hurling Championship (1): 1914
Munster Senior Hurling Championship (1): 1914

Leitrim
Connacht Senior Football Championship (1): 1927

References

1887 births
1957 deaths
Hurling managers
Gaelic football managers